is a railway station in the city of Tochigi, Tochigi, Japan, operated by the private railway operator Tōbu Railway. The station is numbered "TN-09".

Lines

Station layout
This station consists of a single island platform serving two tracks, connected to the station building by an underground passageway.

Platforms

Adjacent stations

History
Shizuwa Station opened on 1 April 1929. The station was originally called , but the name was changed to its present name on 1 July 1929.

From 17 March 2012, station numbering was introduced on all Tōbu lines, with Shizuwa Station becoming "TN-09".

Passenger statistics
In fiscal 2019, the station was used by an average of 1196 passengers daily (boarding passengers only).

Surrounding area
Iwafune-Shizuwa Post Office

See also
 List of railway stations in Japan

References

External links

 Shizuwa Station information 

Railway stations in Tochigi Prefecture
Stations of Tobu Railway
Railway stations in Japan opened in 1929
Tobu Nikko Line
Tochigi, Tochigi